Atambua is the regency seat of Belu Regency, East Nusa Tenggara, Indonesia.

The town stretches as far as 8.5 km from north to south and 5 km from east to west, and is located in the north of the western half of Timor Island. The town is located at an altitude of about 350 m above sea level with temperatures ranging between 23 and 35 degrees Celsius making this area feel quite warm.

An influx of citizens fleeing from East Timor in 1999 made Atambua a big town. It is now the second-largest town in West Timor behind Kupang, also the fourth-largest town in East Nusa Tenggara behind Kupang, Maumere and Ende. Most of its citizens speak Tetun and Dawan. Atambua is a multi-ethnic town with most of its citizens from Timor, Rote, Sabu, and Flores with some emigrants from East Timor and China. But in spite of diversity, the citizens still live in harmony.

The town's religion is made up of over 90% of Roman Catholic, 5% of Protestant and a few more of Muslim, Hindu, and Buddhist. The town is home to the Roman Catholic Diocese of Atambua. The Diocese's population is over 95% Catholic, among the highest percentages of Catholics in all of Indonesia.

History 
Atambua was founded by the Dutch in October 1916, having moved from Atapupu, a port village in Kakuluk Mesak. Atambua was briefly occupied by the Imperial Japanese Army from 1942 to 1943. They planted many trees, which can be seen in Hutan Jati Nenuk. After Independence, Indonesia's first president, Sukarno went to Atambua and planted more trees in the place now called Lapangan Umum. The most notable tree planted there is the banyan tree. In September 1999, more than 250,000 refugees arrived here from East Timor, after their vote for independence and the following violence. As late as 2002, an estimated 60,000 refugees remained in camps.

Media

Television 
As like Belu Regency, the television in this town is limited, which are:
 TVRI (UHF 10)
 Belu TV (UHF 37)

Radio AM/FM 
In this town there are many radio stations, which are:

*) SCBT means Saluran Citra Budaya Timor (Timor Culture Channel)
**) The radio is currently turned off

Transportation Systems
The town's transport system relies mainly on minibuses, usually called bemo or mikrolet, and "motorcycle taxi" (Ojek) provide an alternative. There are only four routes in the town served by the Mikrolets that connect the central area of Atambua with outlying zones. The ojeks do not have a fixed route.

Land Transportation 
Inter-city buses connect Atambua with other towns in West Timor. The city and towns that can be connected are Kupang, Soe and Kefamenanu; the distance between Atambua and Kefamenanu is 87 km, between Atambua and Soe is 179 km, and between Atambua and Kupang is 289 km.

Atambua is a major gateway to East Timor by land. To go to East Timor  (Timor-Leste), the vehicles usually used by road to Indonesia-East Timor (Timor-Leste) Immigration checks in Mota'ain (Indonesia) near Batugade are mostly with Bus and Car, such as SUVs and MPVs and Motorcycles. The distance between Atambua and Mota'ain (Indonesia-Timor Leste borders) is 36 km.

Air Transportation 
There is an airport in Atambua, A. A. Bere Tallo Airport, about 5 kilometers from the town centre. The airport's runway is 1600m long and can therefore be used by a quite big aircraft. Daily flights to the airport is used by the Susi Air plane, Wings Air plane and Trans Nusa plane. All these flights are mainly on the Atambua - Kupang route.

Water Transportation 
Atambua also has two sea ports, Atapupu for cargo and oil, and Teluk Gurita for passengers (ferry port). There is a weekly Atambua-Kalabahi (Alor) ferry service.

Climate
Atambua has a tropical savanna climate (Aw) with moderate to little rainfall from April to October and heavy rainfall from November to March.

References

Populated places in East Nusa Tenggara
Regency seats of East Nusa Tenggara
West Timor